The 2000–01 Segunda Liga season was the 11th season of the competition and the 67th season of recognised second-tier football in Portugal. As the LPFP took over all nationwide professional leagues the competition was renamed from Segunda Divisão de Honra to Segunda Liga.

Overview
The league was contested by 18 teams with CD Santa Clara winning the championship and gaining promotion to the Primeira Liga along with Varzim SC and Vitória Setúbal. At the other end of the table Imortal DC, FC Marco and SC Freamunde were relegated to the Segunda Divisão.

League standings

Footnotes

External links
 Portugal 2000/01 - RSSSF (Jorge Santos, Jan Schoenmakers and Daniel Dalence)
 Portuguese II Liga 2000/2001 - footballzz.co.uk

Liga Portugal 2 seasons
Port
2000–01 in Portuguese football leagues